Cave Rave is the second studio album by English/Spanish electronic music band Crystal Fighters, released on 24 May 2013 on their label, Zirkulo. The album consists of a mix of genres from Basque folk to straight electronic and dubstep. It was preceded by the official release of the single "You & I" as well as the airing and/or online streaming of the first four tracks

Development
The album was recorded in Los Angeles. It was produced by Justin Meldal-Johnson, and mixed by Manny Marroquin in LA.

Artwork
The album artwork was created for the band by artist Paul Laffoley, and was unveiled on Jay-Z's Life + Times website on 18 February 2013.

Release
The band released a preview clip of "Wave" on 6 February 2013. On 18 February, they announced the release of Cave Rave, a larger tour in Europe and a tour across North America, and posted the song Separator on YouTube.  The official video for "Separator" was posted on YouTube on 8 April. The official video for "You & I" was posted on YouTube on 23 April. The track "LA Calling" was streamed on the official Crystal Fighters website on 14 May.

"You & I" is the album's official lead single. The song was debuted on BBC Radio 1's Zane Lowe show as the "Hottest Record in the World".  Subsequently, it has been added to BBC Radio 1's playlist and 3FM in the Netherlands' playlist as MEGAHIT. The video was directed by Elliot Sellers and was premiered on Vice Noisey.  Sunless 97 remix was premiered on FADER (magazine), and Gigamesh remix was premiered on Vibe Magazine. 

On 14 May 2013 The Guardian announced Crystal Fighters plans to hold a 'Cave Rave' in the heart of the Basque countryside on 29 August 2013. 

"LA Calling" was the second single to be aired from the Cave Rave album. The Guardian published a link to "LA Calling" on 13 May 2013. 

"You & I" was added to BBC Radio 1's B List on 5 June 2013.

Composition
On 9 May 2013, on This Is Fake DIY, lead singer Sebastian Pringle gave a track-by-track guide to the album .

Critical reception

The album was positively received by critics. upon release. The Times newspaper called the album "overwhelmingly infectious" in a 4/5 review; The Line of Best Fit awarded the album 8.5/10 and called it "a delirious pleasure"; The 405 website said it "a perfect companion for sizzling meat and endless sunsets"; Aesthetica called it "a collection of enlightening anthems that will inspire listeners to keep dancing all night"; The Big Issue said the album is "like an upbeat Arcade Fire"; Huffington Post said the album is "bursting with so much life and euphoria." The Evening Standard described the album as "...abound of a deep love of Basque culture and the occasional splash of tequila. Take this CD on holiday, or, even better, see them live."

Track listing

Personnel
Credits for Crystal Fighters adapted from liner notes.

Crystal Fighters
 Crystal Fighters – additional production
 Sebastian Pringle – vocals, acoustic guitar, backing vocals, bass guitar, charango, classical guitar, electric guitar, kalimba, keyboards, percussion, programming, txalaparta, txistu, ukulele
 Gilbert Vierich – vocals, acoustic guitar, backing vocals, bass guitar, charango, classical guitar, electric guitar, kalimba, keyboards, percussion, programming, txalaparta, txistu, ukulele
 Graham Dickson – vocals, acoustic guitar, backing vocals, bass guitar, charango, classical guitar, electric guitar, kalimba, keyboards, percussion, programming, txalaparta, txistu, ukulele
 Andrea Marongiu – drums, percussion
 Eleanor Fletcher – backing vocals

Additional personnel

 Todd Burke – engineering
 Kristian Donaldson – engineering
 Chris Gehringer – mastering
 Tim Green – design
 Lauren Johnson – backing vocals
 Paul Laffoley – album cover
 Manny Marroquin – mixing
 Andrew McDonnell – engineering
 Justin Meldal-Johnsen – bass guitar, electric guitar, engineering, keyboards, percussion, production, programming

 Nila Raja – backing vocals
 Shaun Savage – engineering
 Mike Schuppan – engineering
 Chris Testa – engineering
 Holly Walker – backing vocals
 Patrick Warren – piano
 Lionel Williams – inside cover
 Hugh Worskett – pre-production
 Sigrid Zeiner-Gundersen – backing vocals
 Luzmira Zerpa – backing vocals

Charts

Release history

Cave Rave event
On Tuesday 14 May 2013 The Guardian announced Crystal Fighters plans to hold a "cave rave" in the heart of the Basque countryside on 29 August 2013.

The Cave Rave event took place on Thursday 29 August at Zugarramurdi cave outside San Sebastian, deep within the band's spiritual home of the Basque countryside. New wavers Belako and party-starting six piece Wilhelm & The Dancing Animals opened the show and warmed up the crowd before Crystal Fighters took to the stage. The show was sold out and the review were all extremely positive with coverages on the Rolling Stone, El Pais and many other relevant blogs online.

References

2013 albums
Crystal Fighters albums
Atlantic Records albums
Albums produced by Justin Meldal-Johnsen